The former Post and Telegraph Building, now known as Chaffers Dock Apartments, is a building located in Wellington, New Zealand.

The building, located on Herd Street, was designed by Edmund Anscombe and built in 1939. The building is situated on reclaimed land, and sits on about 400 concrete piles up to 18m long. It originally had two full-size tennis courts on the roof, but these were demolished during World War II to make way for a sixth storey. The building ceased to be used by New Zealand Post in the late 1980s.

The building was refurbished in the mid-2000s, and currently houses a mix of apartments, restaurants and shops. It has a Category II listing with Heritage New Zealand.

References

External links

Anscombe's building and the royal yacht HMY Britannia 1963
Wellington City Council - Heritage on the Waterfront

Buildings and structures in Wellington City
Art Deco architecture in New Zealand
Edmund Anscombe buildings
1930s architecture in New Zealand
Heritage New Zealand Category 2 historic places in the Wellington Region